Brachylia semicurvatus is a moth in the family Cossidae. It was described by Max Gaede in 1930. It is found in Africa.

References

Cossinae
Moths described in 1930
Moths of Africa